
Gmina Łososina Dolna is a rural gmina (administrative district) in Nowy Sącz County, Lesser Poland Voivodeship, in southern Poland.

Villages
Gmina Łososina Dolna contains the villages and settlements of Białawoda, Bilsko, Łęki, Łososina Dolna, Łyczanka, Michalczowa, Rąbkowa, Skrzętla-Rojówka, Stańkowa, Świdnik, Tabaszowa, Tęgoborze, Witowice Dolne, Witowice Górne, Wronowice, Zawadka, Żbikowice and Znamirowice.

Neighbouring gminas
Gmina Łososina Dolna is bordered by the gminas of Chełmiec, Czchów, Gródek nad Dunajcem, Iwkowa, Laskowa and Limanowa.

References
Polish official population figures 2006

Lososina Dolna
Nowy Sącz County